Silimpur Union is a union of Tangail Sadar Upazila, Tangail District, Bangladesh. It is situated 10 km south of Tangail, The District Headquarter.

Demographics

According to Population Census 2011 performed by Bangladesh Bureau of Statistics, The total population of Silimpur union is 20794. There are 4837 households in total.

Education

The literacy rate of Silimpur Union is 46.4% (Male-50.3%, Female-42.9%).

See also
 Union Councils of Tangail District

References

Populated places in Dhaka Division
Populated places in Tangail District
Unions of Tangail Sadar Upazila